The Ottawa River (Shawnee: Koskothiipi ) is a tributary of the Auglaize River, approximately  long, in northwestern Ohio in the United States. The river is named for the Ottawa tribe of Native Americans who inhabited the area in the 18th century.  It shares its name with another river in northwestern Ohio, the Ottawa River in Toledo, as well as the Ottawa River in Ontario & Quebec, Canada.

It rises in northern Hardin County and flows northwest, then west-southwest through Lima.

The Ottawa River is also known locally and historically as "Hog Creek".  The origin of this name is ascribed to the following legend:
Alexander McKee, the British Indian Agent, who resided at the Machachac towns, on Mad River, during the incursion of General Logan from Kentucky in 1786, was obliged to flee with his effects.  He had a large lot of swine, which were driven on to the borders of this stream, and when the Indians (Shawnee) came on they called the river Koshko Sepe, which in the Shawnee language signified 'The Creek of the Hogs, or Hog Stream'.

See also
List of rivers of Ohio

References

External links
This Is My River - Ottawa River Coalition

Rivers of Ohio
Lima, Ohio
Rivers of Hardin County, Ohio
Rivers of Putnam County, Ohio
Rivers of Allen County, Ohio
Tributaries of Lake Erie